Westminster College is a private, liberal arts college in New Wilmington, Pennsylvania. Founded in 1852, it is affiliated with the Presbyterian Church (USA). The student population is approximately 1,307 undergraduate and graduate students.

History
Westminster formed as a result of a meeting on Jan. 21, 1852, between the Ohio and Shenango Presbyteries. In 2009, The Washington Monthly''' ranked Westminster College "third in social mobility" among 253 liberal arts colleges. In 2010, Forbes ranked Westminster first in the nation as the "Best College for Women in Science, Technology, Engineering and Math." In 2008 36% Westminster's graduating class received their degrees in the fields of science, technology, engineering and math (STEM)--and unusually, more of those STEM graduates were women than men.

Campus

Athletics
The Westminster Titans compete in NCAA Division III athletics. Before moving to the NCAA, Westminster competed in the NAIA for many years. For a brief period, Westminster was a member of the NCAA Division II Great Lakes Intercollegiate Athletic Conference (GLIAC). The Titans currently are a member of the Presidents' Athletic Conference.

The first official football game by the Westminster Titans was in December 1891. They lost to Geneva 42–0. The next year was the first official season; they played 4 games that year and went 3–1. Over the next 100 plus years, the Titans have had a record of 577–406–54. They are one of only 10 schools to record over 575 wins in school history. They have won the national championship 6 times with 11 undefeated seasons. Five former Titans football players have been enshrined in the College Football Hall of Fame: Harold Davis, Joe Fusco, Larry Pugh, Harold Burry and Joe Micchia. Hall of Fame head coach Tuss McLaughry was not an alumnus but did coach the Titans for four years. The current head football coach of the Titans is Scott Benzel, who became head coach in 2014.

Westminster men's basketball team lost in the national NAIA title game twice (1960 and 1962) under coach Charles 'Buzz' Ridl.  Ridl was inducted into the NAIA Hall of Fame (1969), Western Pennsylvania Coaches Hall of Fame (1980), and the Pennsylvania Sports Hall of Fame (1992).

Publications
Westminster has one alumni publication and three student publications.  The alumni publication is Westminster College Magazine, which is a quarterly magazine detailing on-campus and alumni activities.  The student publications include The Holcad, a weekly student-run newspaper; Argo, the student-run yearbook; and Scrawl, a student-run yearly literary magazine.

Titan Radio
Westminster's radio station, Titan Radio (Digital 88.9/WWNW-FM) serves Lawrence County, Pennsylvania.  The station streams online on titanradio.net and features a hot adult contemporary format.  The station is programmed and managed by students for the campus and the community.  Programming includes live, local sports.  Titan Radio broadcasts home football games for Wilmington Area High School during the regular season.  The station also broadcasts regular season football games for the Westminster Titans live on the air and online.  Titan Radio also broadcasts men's and women's basketball.  In 2008, Titan Radio received a BEST CAMPUS RADIO STATION recognition from the Princeton Review ranking it among the Top 20 College Radio Stations in the U.S.  That recognition continued in 2009, 2010, 2011, 2012 and 2013.  In 2012 and 2013, the Princeton Review survey ranked Titan Radio in the Top 10.  Titan Radio is a broadcast member of the Pennsylvania Associated Press.  The station is the only AP member station in Lawrence County.  The station is also a member of the Pennsylvania Association of Broadcasters (PAB).  Titan Radio carries radio newscasts from NBC News broadcasts on weekdays at 9 a.m., noon and 5 p.m. Those newscasts are paired with two-minute Titan Radio newscasts covering local, state and campus news.  These newscasts are produced and reported by students in the Titan Radio newsroom.

WCN
Westminster's television station is the Westminster Cable Network (WCN).  It provides programming to Comcast subscribers in New Castle & Lawrence County on channel 183.  WCN is available on Armstrong Cable in New Wilmington on channel 72.  Armstrong Cable also carries WCN in Lawrence and Mercer counties on channel 204.  WCN creates and televises local programming including live high school football games, live Westminster College football games and Westminster Christmas Vespers.  Other live programming includes the Lawrence County Band Festival and the New Castle Light Up Night parade.  WCN produces a news magazine show, WCN 24/7 (formerly known as The County Line and Inside Lawrence County) and a weekly sports program called Coaches Corner focused on football in the fall and men's and women's basketball in the spring.

WCN 24/7
Titan Radio News and WCN operate WCN 24/7online at wcn247.com as a multimedia outlet for news, sports, information and entertainment content produced by Westminster students studying the Broadcast and Digital Communications major.  Programming includes news stories covering the campus and community and Pennsylvania, podcasts, vodcasts, online documentaries and more.

Student organizations

Student Government Association
The Student Government Association (SGA) exists primarily for governing and providing entertainment for the student body.

Greek life
The four social fraternities each have their own off campus house which junior and senior class brothers can live in. Each of the five sororities have their own respective hall in a sorority dorm building on campus that sisters can live in if they choose.
The fraternities are: Alpha Sigma Phi, Phi Kappa Tau, Sigma Phi Epsilon, and Theta Chi. The sororities are: Alpha Gamma Delta, Kappa Delta, Phi Mu, Sigma Kappa, and Zeta Tau Alpha.

Notable alumni
 Eric Burns – author, media critic, broadcast journalist
 David S. Cercone – U.S. federal judge
 Amy Marie Charles – professor of English literature at The University of North Carolina at Greensboro
 Thomas C. Cochran – congressman, R-PA, 70th–74th Congresses (1927–1935)
 Thomas DiLorenzo – Austrian School economist and author, Professor at Loyola University in Baltimore
 JD Eicher – singer, songwriter, and producer
 Jennifer Elvgren – writer
 William N. Johnston – president of Wesley College (Delaware) 2002–2015
 Joe Jordano – college baseball coach at Pittsburgh
 Tim Kaiser – producer of Seinfeld and Will & Grace and 2 Broke Girls James Kennedy – Congressman, R-OH (1903–1911)
 Gerald LaValle – Pennsylvania State Senator (1971 M.Ed.)
 Mark Longietti – Pennsylvania State Representative (2006–present)
 Amber Mariano née Brkich – reality television personality (winner of Survivor: All-Stars''), married to Rob Mariano
 Andrew McKelvey – chairman and CEO of Monster.com (December 1996 – October 2006)
 Joe Micchia – 2013 College Football Hall of Fame inductee
 Daniel Migliore – theologian and author; Professor Emeritus, Princeton Theological Seminary
 Samuel Henry Miller – congressman, R-PA, 47th, 48th, and 64th Congresses (1881–1885, 1915–1917)
 Gladys Milligan – painter
 David W. Orr – Chair and professor of environmental studies at Oberlin College in Ohio and influential figure in educational reform
 Deborah Platt Majoras – chairman of the Federal Trade Commission (August 2004 – 2008)
 Greg Nicotero - special make-up effects creator, television producer, and director
 M. Richard Rose (1955-2021) – former President of Alfred University and the Rochester Institute of Technology
 Jerry Schmitt – football head coach at Duquesne University, former player and coach at Westminster
 R.C. Sproul – theologian and founder of Ligonier Ministries

Notable faculty
 Wes Craven – (former) film maker and writer
 James Ashbrook Perkins - professor emeritus

References

External links

 
Educational institutions established in 1852
Universities and colleges in Lawrence County, Pennsylvania
1852 establishments in Pennsylvania
Liberal arts colleges in Pennsylvania
Universities and colleges affiliated with the Presbyterian Church (USA)
Private universities and colleges in Pennsylvania